The Surrendered is a novel by Chang-Rae Lee about the lives of three characters during the Korean War. The novel also flashes back to the Japanese invasion of Manchuria and flashes forward to the 1980s in New York City and Italy. The book makes references to the Gallic Wars, Hector, and A Memory of Solferino, among other works. It was nominated as a finalist for the 2011 Pulitzer Prize for Fiction. It won the Dayton Literary Peace Prize for fiction in 2011.

Characters
June Han - A Korean girl who became an orphan after the death of her family
Hector Brennan - American janitor and former soldier of Korean War
Sylvie Tanner - wife of a missionary who had a troubled past and becomes involved in an affair with Hector
Benjamin Li - Sylvie's mentor
Ames Tanner - Sylvie's husband
Nicholas - June's and Hector's son
Reverend Han - a man who has taken care of orphans
Min - an orphan who becomes Hector's friend

References

External links
 The Surrendered at Goodreads

Novels set during the Korean War
Novels by Chang-Rae Lee
Novels set in New York City
2010 American novels
Riverhead Books books